Final Fantasy IV: The After Years is an episodic role-playing video game co-developed by Matrix Software and Square Enix, as the sequel to the 1991 title Final Fantasy IV. Set 17 years after Final Fantasy IV, The After Years follows the original cast and their descendants in episodic tales as a new villain appears, setting into action a mysterious chain of events that threatens the fate of the Blue Planet. Largely utilizing assets, locations, and mechanics from its predecessor, the title incorporates higher quality character graphics and several new gameplay systems.

The game was originally released in 2008 in Japan for mobile phones and was released worldwide as a port for WiiWare in 2009. The game was bundled with Final Fantasy IV as the PlayStation Portable compilation Final Fantasy IV: The Complete Collection, which also included a new game; Final Fantasy IV: Interlude, which served as a bridge between the original game and The After Years. The game was remade in 3D for the Android and iOS platforms using the same style as the Nintendo DS version of Final Fantasy IV, and was later released for Microsoft Windows.

Gameplay

Final Fantasy IV: The After Years uses most of the gameplay features of Final Fantasy IV, including random encounters and the Active Time Battle (ATB) system, which originated with Final Fantasy IV. It also retains a number of the graphical enhancements from the WonderSwan Color and Game Boy Advance versions of Final Fantasy IV, while further improving the quality of character sprites to a level comparable with those of Final Fantasy VI.

The battle system uses a new feature called the "Age of the Moon", reflecting the game's lunar phases changing with each rest at an inn, or over a set period of in-game time. The altering phases change physical and magical attack powers for both player characters and enemies. Certain rare monsters also only appear during certain lunar phases. The game also introduces a new type of combination attack known as a "Band" ability. Similar to the Double and Triple Techs of Chrono Trigger, these allow two or more characters to coordinate separate commands into a single new attack at the cost of MP from all involved. Band abilities are extremely powerful, and there are over 70 different combinations in all.

Plot

Setting
Following the events of the original Final Fantasy IV, the second moon leaves the Blue Planet's orbit, and a period of peace begins as Damcyan, Eblan, and the Village of Mist are rebuilt, while the Kingdom of Baron comes under the rule of Cecil and his wife, Rosa. However, seventeen years later, the second moon reappears, much closer to the planet than it was the first time, and the unchanging Crystals begin to emit a soft light. The meaning behind these events remains unknown.

Most of the cast from the original game return, with many of Final Fantasy IVs NPCs now playable. A number of entirely new characters are also introduced. Among these new additions are Ceodore Harvey, Prince of Baron and son to Cecil and Rosa; the "Hooded Man", a wandering swordsman enshrouded in purple robes who seems strangely familiar with Cecil's previous adventure; the "Mysterious Woman", a female antagonist able to summon Eidolons, who attacks the kingdoms in search of the Crystals, and the "Man in Black", a man with powerful black magic who refuses to reveal his past. The storyline of the game unfolds through episodic chapters, released roughly once a month, each primarily focused on a specific character. These chapters utilize foreshadowing, cliffhangers, flashbacks, and a nonlinear narrative structure to build the world setting and both explore and expand upon the mysterious events befalling the Blue Planet. The final chapter, which is considerably longer than all others, draws all of the chapters together, linking them up into one unifying narrative.

Synopsis
The story begins as characters from the original game begin to notice the reappearance of the second moon. This is of great concern to Cecil and Rosa who remember their previous ordeal. Meanwhile, Ceodore sets out with Biggs and Wedge, members of the Red Wings, as part of his initiation into the famous air force. Ceodore is a nervous young man who is afraid he will never step out of the shadow of his famous parents. As his test begins, he descends into a cave to obtain the Knight's Emblem, which turns out to be a rat's tail. Wedge and Biggs explain that the purpose of the test was to show him that he already had what it takes to be a Red Wing, he just needed to prove it to himself. As the Red Wings set off, the game cuts to Baron, where Cecil, Rosa, and Cid are defending the city from an onslaught of monsters. After surviving several waves of attacks they meet the Mysterious Woman. Cecil asks Cid to take Rosa to safety as he confronts the intruder. The woman summons Bahamut and defeats Cecil.

Meanwhile, the airship carrying Ceodore also encounters monsters. The airship crashes killing everyone but Ceodore. Realizing he is now the last of the Red Wings, he sets out on the long journey home. However, he is attacked by a group of monsters and is about to be killed when he is rescued by a Hooded Man. As the two head toward Mysidia, the game intercuts to Mt. Ordeals, where Kain is heading out toward Baron. Along the way, he gathers the Crystals of Air, Earth, Fire and Water at the request of the Mysterious Woman. Eventually, he kidnaps Rosa as well, stating that he is planning to kill Cecil so he can have Rosa for himself. Meanwhile, Ceodore, the Hooded Man, and Edward intercept Kain in front of Cecil's throneroom. At this point, it is revealed that the Hooded Man is in fact the real Kain, and the Kain that has taken the crystals and Rosa is Kain's "dark half". After their duel, the true Kain wins and becomes a Holy Dragoon. Kain, Ceodore, Rosa, and Edward continue on their way to meet Cecil as the first episode ends.

The second episode begins with Rydia, Luca and Edge on board an airship in the subterranean world. The Man in Black mysteriously appears from nowhere and takes control of the airship, directing it toward Baron. As the party approaches the castle, they witness meteors from the second moon bombarding the world. They return to Baron Castle to find it sealed by a magical force field. The four travel the world searching for their lost friends, encountering the Mysterious Woman again, and helping Rydia search for her missing Eidolons. After breaking the Mysterious Woman's control over Titan, Shiva, Ramuh, and Ifrit, the party is able to enter Baron Castle and find Cecil threatening Ceodore, Rosa, and Kain. After freeing Cecil from the Mysterious Woman's control, the Man in Black reveals himself to be Golbez, Cecil's brother. By this stage, the second moon is getting closer to the Blue Planet and the party realizes they have to find a way to stop it. Boarding the Lunar Whale they land on the second moon and descend into its depths. During the descent, the party encounters several bosses from the other Final Fantasy games. Eventually, they encounter Cecil's evil side, the Dark Knight. Once the Dark Knight is defeated, Cecil returns to the Light.

Once the party reaches the lowermost depths of the second moon, they discover that the Mysterious Woman is not a single individual, but an entire race of identical women called "Maenads". Each Maenad was part of a group of beings created to retrieve the crystals. Venturing further, they encounter an entity known as The Creator. He reveals that his race died out due to a failure to evolve. The Creator decided that the universe should not be allowed to be overrun with inferior species, so he created the crystals and sent them to various life-sustaining worlds as a way to monitor the progress of life on each planet. He determined if the world did not evolve to its fullest potential it must be destroyed, which is what is currently happening to the Blue Planet. After the party defeats the Creator, the moon starts to break apart. As they escape, the party pauses to rescue a child Maenad, and the other Maenads turn on their "father" and defeat the Creator so the party can escape with her. As the Creator dies, he thanks the party for defeating him, indicating he may have felt some regret for his actions. Once the party returns to the Planet, they return to their various homes to resume their lives. Rydia adopts the child Maenad and names her Cuore, and Cecil informs Ceodore that he shall serve in the Red Wings under the command of Kain. Cecil also orders all of Baron's airships to be disarmed and instead be used to help the other kingdoms rebuild after the devastation caused by the second moon.

Development
Final Fantasy IV: The After Years was developed by Matrix Software with Takashi Tokita as producer. The game was in development in 2007. During the development of the enhanced remake of Final Fantasy IV for the Nintendo DS, Tokita was approached by Square Enix's mobile team to collaborate on a Final Fantasy game for Japanese mobile phones. Tokita proposed the idea of a sequel to Final Fantasy IV based on the idea that it would be entertaining for players to complete the remake and be able to play the sequel afterward. The choice to keep the 2D sprites was to allow as many chapters to be made as possible while also invoking the feeling of nostalgia for its predecessor. Tokita, who had grown attached to the characters, having also previously worked as scenario writer for the original game, decided that releasing the sequel in mobile format would be a good idea, as it would allow players to access the game for only a short while after completing the DS remake. By releasing it in episodic format, he also hoped that players would anticipate future chapters in much the same way as an anime or manga series, rather than tiring of the game after completing it all at once.

Although the look and feel of the game have remained largely unchanged from that of the original Final Fantasy IV, new gameplay elements were incorporated, and Kazuko Shibuya, 2D sprite artist for the first six Final Fantasy games, returned to create new, higher quality character graphics. Yoshitaka Amano also returned as an image illustrator, with character designs by Akira Oguro, a previous colleague of Tokita's and storyboard artist for Square Enix. Much of Nobuo Uematsu's original musical for Final Fantasy IV is also included, although new compositions are also used.

After the mobile release, there were rumors about the title getting a release outside of Japan. A rating by the ESRB for a Wii game titled Final Fantasy IV: The After Years was discovered in late February 2009, leading to speculation regarding a North American localization of the game distributed via WiiWare, which was officially confirmed at the Game Developers Conference. Square Enix also trademarked The After Years in Europe, hinting at a release in that territory as well. It was later confirmed with the opening of the official site, which provided a PEGI rating for the title.

The WiiWare port of the game features several graphical enhancements over the mobile version, including larger screen resolution, clearer menu screens and fonts, and improved character portraits. The English localization follows the precedents set by the DS remake of Final Fantasy IV, featuring similar writing and making use of the same translations of names and terminology. A few edits have been made to the English version, including the modification of Ceodore's official character artwork to Westernize his face, as well as alterations to several female characters in order to make their clothing less revealing.

Releases
Originally released to the Japanese mobile phone market as Final Fantasy IV the After: Tsuki no Kikan, the first two installments of the episodic game, "Prologue" and "Ceodore's Tale", were published simultaneously for each individual platform. A series of eight supplemental tales were then released in intervals of about four weeks. These were followed by a semifinal installment, "Shūketsu Hen 'Tsuki no Inryoku'" (lit. "Gathering Tale: Gravitation of the Moon"), which required that the player has completed the supplemental "Kain's Tale". The game's finale was released in two parts as "Shūshō Zenpen 'Shingetsu'" (lit. "Last Chapter Part One 'The True Moon'") and "Shūshō Kōhen 'Hoshikui'" (lit. "Last Chapter Part Two 'The Planet Eater'").

An enhanced port of the game was published through the WiiWare service in 2009. Although it retained the episodic format used in the mobile version, the release structure was modified. The player purchases the main story consisting of the "Prologue", "Ceodore's Tale" and "Kain's Tale", while the additional supplemental installments were subsequently released as add-ons. The penultimate episode and the two-part finale were combined into a single final installment called "The Crystals: The Planet Eater". In both versions, the player is able to save their settings as well as their characters' status and equipment at the end of gameplay, and can also further explore each tale to discover new items and complete special tasks. The complete game was bundled with Final Fantasy IV and a new scenario (Final Fantasy IV: Interlude) as the PlayStation Portable compilation Final Fantasy IV: The Complete Collection, released in 2011. A 3D remake in the same vein as the 3D remake of Final Fantasy IV was released for iOS and Android on November 24, 2013. This version was ported onto Steam for Windows and was released on May 12, 2015.

Reception

In August 2008, Final Fantasy IV: The After Years reached a benchmark of one million downloads (not including downloads of the free prologue chapter) in the first five months following its initial release. As of December 20, 2010, it has exceeded 4.5 million paid downloads.

Reviews of the WiiWare port of the game have been mixed, with an overall score of 69/100 at Metacritic. IGN gave the game an 8 out of 10, calling the story "engrossing but mysterious" and stating that the gameplay, graphics, and presentation, while "dated", are "part of the charm". However, GameSpot gave the game a score of only 5.5 out of 10, saying that it had a "disjointed, poorly constructed narrative" and an excessively high encounter rate, and criticized "recycled" content such as the music, graphics, environments, and story. Jason Schreier of Kotaku also gave the game an extremely negative review. The After Years was nominated for Game of the Year by Nintendo Power, as well as WiiWare Game of the Year.

See also
 Before Crisis: Final Fantasy VII
 Final Fantasy Dimensions

References
Notes

Citations

External links
 Official North American website
 Official Japanese website (WiiWare version)
 Official Japanese website (feature phone version)
 Official Japanese website (smart phone version)
 Final Fantasy Wiki page

2008 video games
Android (operating system) games
Final Fantasy IV
Final Fantasy video games
Final Fantasy spin-offs
Role-playing video games
IOS games
Video game sequels
Video games developed in Japan
WiiWare games
Multiplayer and single-player video games
Matrix Software games
Windows games
Video games scored by Junya Nakano
Video games with alternate endings